The Border Gateway Multicast Protocol (BGMP) was an IETF project which attempted to design a true inter-domain multicast routing protocol. BGMP was planned to be able to scale in order to operate in the global Internet.

References

External links 
RFC 3913: Border Gateway Multicast Protocol] BGMP Protocol Specification.  September 2004.
Border Gateway Multicast Protocol IETF charter
BGMP (Border-Gateway Multicast Protocol) Homepage

Internet Standards
Internet protocols
Routing protocols
Internet architecture